Mikhail Narokov was a Soviet male actor. People's Artist of the RSFSR.

Selected filmography 
 1917 — The Alarm
 1927 — Land in Captivity
 1927 — Man from the Restaurant

References

External links 
 Михаил Нароков on kino-teatr.ru

Soviet male actors
1879 births
1958 deaths